William Geoffrey Thompson OBE (16 November 1936 – 12 June 2004) was a British businessman who was the managing director and owner of Blackpool Pleasure Beach, Pleasureland Southport and Frontierland, Morecambe. He rose to his position in 1976 after the death of his father, Leonard Thompson.

Career
Geoffrey Thompson was appointed managing director of Blackpool Pleasure Beach in 1976, following the death of his father. During his tenure, he bought two separate amusement parks, Pleasureland Southport and Frontierland, Morecambe.  The latter of which he closed down in 2000. He invested heavily into the Pleasure Beach during his time, opening the Steeplechase, Avalanche, Revolution, Big One, Ice Blast: The Ride and Valhalla. Like his father, he had a good relationship with Arrow Dynamics with them building many of Pleasure Beach's rides until they went bankrupt in 2002.

He sat on a number of trade agencies, such as the English Tourist Board and the British Association of Leisure Parks, Piers and Attractions, and was appointed an OBE for this work. In 1986, Pleasure Beach became one of the first companies in the UK to register with the Government Profit Related Pay Unit. Under this scheme the company agreed that, where profits exceeded £1 million, 10% would be distributed among the permanent staff according to their length of service. Geoffrey was often in dispute with Blackpool Council over their decision to allow private traders to use land opposite the Pleasure Beach. He won his appeal to clear the land of all trading attractions and the Pleasure Beach has remained unaffected by the situation.

Major installations
During his tenure, many major attractions were built at the Pleasure Beach.

Personal life
Thompson married Barbara Foxcroft in 1962, and had three children; Amanda, Nick and Fiona. He was awarded an OBE in the 1997 Prime Minister's Resignation Honours.

Education
Thompson attended Arnold Junior School and Rossall School, before moving to Shrewsbury.  He later read Economics at Clare College, Cambridge. After graduating, he moved to America to broaden his education, studying Business Administration at Wharton School of the University of Pennsylvania.

Death
Thompson died at Blackpool Pleasure Beach on 12 June 2004, while attending his daughter Amanda's wedding. He left Blackpool Pleasure Beach to Amanda. Before his death, he was quoted as telling her: "If you don’t think you’re strong enough to run the business then you’re not the person I thought you were."

References

1936 births
Blackpool Pleasure Beach
2004 deaths
Officers of the Order of the British Empire
20th-century English businesspeople